The Segusiavī (Gaulish: *Segusiauī/Segusiawī) were a Gallic tribe dwelling around the modern city of Feurs (Auvergne-Rhône-Alpes) during the Iron Age and the Roman period.

Name 
They are mentioned as Segusiavis by Caesar (mid-1st c. BC), as Segosianō͂n (Σεγοσιανῶν) by Strabo (early 1st c. AD), as Segusiavi by Pliny (1st c. AD), and as Segousō̃antoi (Σεγουσῶαντοι) by Ptolemy (2nd c. AD).

The etymology of the Gaulish ethnonym *Segusiauī/Segusiawī is unclear. It probably stems from the Gaulish root sego- ('victory, force'), but the second element is problematic. Irish folklorist Dáithí Ó hÓgáin tentatively translates their name as the 'Victorious Ones'. Since the Segusiavi possessed a wide area just north of the Greek colony of Massalia (Marseille) at the time of Aristotle, he has proposed to see their name as an alternative ethnonym of the Segobriges, the tribe involved in the foundation myth of Massalia.

The city of Feurs, attested by Ptolemy as Phóros Segousiántōn (Φόρος Σεγουσιάντων, 'forum, market of the Segusiavi'; Forum in 950, Fuer in 1227), is indirectly named after the tribe.

Geography 

The chief town of the Segusiavi was known as Forum Segusiavorum (modern Feurs), erected on a pre-Roman settlement which had been occupied from the 2nd century BC onwards. The city lost its local preeminence in the 3rd–4th centuries AD. Under Diocletian, in 297–298, Forum Segusiavorum was incorporated into the province of Lugdunensis Prima.

The Segusiavi also held a fortress at Lugdunum (modern Lyon).

References

Bibliography

See also
 List of peoples of Gaul

 
Historical Celtic peoples
Gauls
History of Paris
Tribes of pre-Roman Gaul
Tribes involved in the Gallic Wars